God Is War is the first full-length studio album by the American band All Pigs Must Die. It was produced by Kurt Ballou and released on August 16, 2011 through Southern Lord Records.

Track listing

Personnel
All Pigs Must Die
 Kevin Baker - vocals
 Ben Koller - drums
 Adam Wentworth - guitar 
 Matt Woods - bass

Miscellaneous staff
 Kurt Ballou - production, engineering, mixing
 John Golden - mastering
 Florian Bertmer - illustrations

References

2011 albums
Albums produced by Kurt Ballou
Southern Lord Records albums
All Pigs Must Die (band) albums